George O'Reilly (27 February 1911 – 17 June 1992) was a Canadian politician.

Born in Pointe-Saint-Charles, Montreal, Quebec, O'Reilly was a Verdun city councillor from 1951 to 1960 and mayor from 1960 to 1966. He was elected to the Legislative Assembly of Quebec for Montréal-Verdun in 1960. A Liberal, he was re-elected in 1962. He was appointed to the Legislative Council of Quebec for De la Durantaye in 1964 and served until its abolishment in 1968.

References

1911 births
1992 deaths
Quebec Liberal Party MLCs
Quebec Liberal Party MNAs
Mayors of places in Quebec
People from Le Sud-Ouest
People from Verdun, Quebec
Canadian people of Irish descent
Quebec people of Irish descent